Justin Keeler (born 17 April 1978) is an English footballer who played in The Football League for A.F.C. Bournemouth.

References

1978 births
Living people
Footballers from Hillingdon
Association football midfielders
English footballers
Christchurch F.C. players
AFC Bournemouth players
Dorchester Town F.C. players
Bashley F.C. players
Brockenhurst F.C. players
Bournemouth F.C. players
English Football League players